Liupanshui is a city in western Guizhou province, People's Republic of China. The name Liupanshui combines the first character from the names of each of the city's three constituent counties: Liuzhi, Panzhou, Shuicheng. The city is known locally as "The Cool City" or "Cool Capital" due to its low average summer temperature.

History
The general area is significant as the seat of the historic Yelang political entity, a confederation of tribes that dominated parts of modern-day Guizhou, Hunan, Sichuan and Yunnan provinces.  The city was established in 1978 as a prefecture-level municipality.

Administrative divisions

Its administratively divided to the following county-level jurisdictions:
 District
Zhongshan District （）
Shuicheng District （）
 Special District
Liuzhi Special District （）
 County-level city
Panzhou City （）

Ethnic groups
The Liupanshui City Ethnic Gazetteer (2003:139, 154, 160) lists the following ethnic groups and their respective locations.
Bai
Pan County (pop. 16,829): in Jiuying, Gaotun, Yangchangba, Luna, Shahe
Shuicheng County (pop. 6,711): in Longchang, Yingpan
Gelao
Liuzhi Special District (pop. 8,128): in Langdai, Xinhua, Duoque
Shui
Pan County (pop. 3,519): in 
Shuicheng County (pop. 4,211): in Fa'er

Climate

Transportation

Rail
Liupanshui is a major rail hub in southwestern China. The Shanghai-Kunming, Liupanshui-Baiguo and Neijiang-Kunming Railways intersect in the city.

Air
The city is served by Liupanshui Yuezhao Airport.

Tourism
Tourism in Liupanshui focuses on minority folk culture and karst landform tourism. This includes the underground lake in Qilin Cave Park, Danxia Mountain, about which Xu Xiake, the Chinese travel writer and geographer of the Ming Dynasty, had written. Yushe National Park includes the Jiucai Ping Scenic Zone. 

The flat-topped Jiucai Ping is the tallest mountain in Guizhou Province at about 2900 meters. Jiucai here means "garlic chives," so named because the mountain is famous for its garlic chive blossoms and annual Jiucai Festival (坪景区霞山) which celebrates Jiushao (坪景霞), the traditional deity of strong-smelling herbs. Other attractions include the sunrise, the sea of clouds, and unusual rock formations. Also notable is the Tiansheng Bridge, "tiansheng" meaning "god-made." There is also a nature reserve called Shuicheng Francois's Leaf Monkey Nature Reserve.

Cuisine
Local cuisine includes Yangrou fen - Lamb rice noodles, and Luoguo yangyu - Fried potatoes.

International relations

Twin towns — Sister cities
Liupanshui is twinned with:
  Tucson, Arizona, United States

See also
History of Yunnan

References 

 
Cities in Guizhou
Pearl River (China)
Prefecture-level divisions of Guizhou